Exiled: A Law & Order Movie is a 1998 (two-hour-format) television film based on the Law & Order  police procedural and legal drama television series; it originally aired on NBC.  Written by Charles Kipps (from a story by Kipps and Chris Noth), the film revolves around Noth's character, Detective Mike Logan.   Kipps received a 1999 Edgar Award for his screenplay.

Plot 
The movie begins three years after Detective Mike Logan's final appearance on Law & Order in 1995. At the end of the episode "Pride," Logan punches a corrupt, homophobic politician in the face on the courthouse steps after the man's acquittal on a murder charge, in front of several reporters. Although he does not lose his job, Logan is "administratively reassigned" to the Domestic Disputes Department on Staten Island. While he struggles to cope with feelings of resentment and isolation, fate offers him a chance at redemption when a forgotten homicide case unexpectedly drifts Logan's way.

The case may uncover a dirty-cop conspiracy (ultimately leading back to the 27th Precinct, the very precinct that banished him), and his commanding officer repeatedly orders him to leave the case to the "real detectives" in the NYPD. Logan sees solving the case as the long-hoped-for chance to resurrect his career and get reinstated as a homicide detective.

Logan also becomes romantically involved with the victim's relative.  Soon, he must choose between one woman's feelings for him and doing whatever it takes to regain the only thing he has ever loved – being an NYPD homicide detective.

Cast
 Chris Noth as Detective Mike Logan
 Dabney Coleman as Lieutenant Kevin Stolper
 Dana Eskelson as Detective Frankie Silvera
 John Fiore as Detective Tony Profaci
 Dann Florek as Captain Don Cragen
 Jerry Orbach as Detective Lennie Briscoe
 Benjamin Bratt as Detective Rey Curtis
 S. Epatha Merkerson as Lieutenant Anita Van Buren
 Sam Waterston as Executive Assistant District Attorney Jack McCoy
 Paul Guilfoyle as Detective Sammy Kurtz
 Ice-T as Seymour "Kingston" Stockton
 Costas Mandylor as Gianni Uzielli
 Tony Musante as Don Giancarlo Uzielli
 Nicole Ari Parker as Georgeanne Taylor
 Leslie Hendrix as Dr. Elizabeth Rodgers

Rapper-turned-actor Ice-T, who appears in this film as a pimp, later joined the cast of Law & Order: Special Victims Unit as Detective Odafin Tutuola.

Dana Eskelson, who played Logan's partner, was later featured as a suspect in season three of Law & Order: Criminal Intent. Eskelson was also featured in two episodes of Law & Order: Special Victims Unit, once as a rape victim in season four and again as the mother of a victim of molestation in season seven.

Paul Guilfoyle of CBS's CSI: Crime Scene Investigation fame plays one of the detectives working under Van Buren. Guilfoyle had previously appeared in the pilot episode of Law & Order, "Everybody's Favorite Bagman", as murder suspect Tony Scalisi.

Dabney Coleman, playing Logan's boss Lieutenant Stolper, later appeared in a 2009 Law & Order: Special Victims Unit episode, "Snatched", as Frank Hager, a career criminal.

Home media
First released in 2011 by boulevard entertainment as a region 0 DVD in wide-screen but with no subtitles or extra features.
Universal Studios Home Entertainment released this title on a region 1 DVD on June 12, 2012.  The film was not however included in the Law & Order: The Complete Series DVD box set released on November 8, 2011.

References

External links 
 
 
 

Law & Order (franchise)
Edgar Award-winning works
Films set in Manhattan
1998 television films
1998 films
1990s legal films
Films set in Staten Island
Films directed by Jean de Segonzac
NBC network original films
American legal films
1990s English-language films
1990s American films